Comrade in America (abbreviated as CIA) is a 2017 Indian Malayalam-language adventure film directed by Amal Neerad, starring Dulquer Salmaan and Karthika Muralidharan in the lead roles. The music is composed by Gopi Sundar, and Renadive handles the cinematography. The film released on 5 May, also the birth date of Karl Marx. The film revolves around the travel of Aji (Dulquer Salmaan), a communist from Kerala who travels to the United States illegally via Latin America and Mexican border to get to his girlfriend Sarah (Karthika Muralidharan) in time before she is forced to marry another person.

Plot 
Aji Mathew is a youngster from Pala and is a strong communist. He comes from a Kerala Congress Party family, where his rich father, Mathew, is a prominent leader in the party. Aji falls in love with Sarah, an American citizen who came to Kerala for her college studies. After getting to know one other, Sarah asks Aji to leave India and move to the US with her. Aji refuses the request, as his motherland has given him everything and he cannot live in a totally capitalistic country. Within weeks, he receives news from his comrade Hari that Sara's parents have taken her back to the United States and that she intends to marry another man. Aji desperately wants to meet with her, even if they cannot be married.

He finds out that there is no way that he can get a visa within the period of the marriage and so decides to illegally enter to the United States through Mexico as suggested by his cousin Cyril, who is in America. Aji first goes to Nicaragua, where a visa is not needed. There, he meets Arul, a Sri Lankan Tamil taxi driver. Together, they decide to go to America. Then both travel to Reynosa in Mexico, where they find a guide to lead them across the borders safely.

Aji meets others in their group, who are also trying to cross over illegally. He becomes friends with Pallavi, a Malayalee in their group. The group is cheated by their guide who robs them and escapes after the first day. Instead of dropping the plan, Akai, a Chinese man among them, says that he has a GPS and can find the route to the US. Through the journey, they encounter an armed gang but they are defeated by the group with Aji's initiation for offence. Arul, after encountering an accident, decides to drop the plan and return to Nicaragua.

As the journey continues, they are found by surveillance drones. Aji, along with Pallavi, Akai and Laden (a Pakistani immigrant) escape. The American police capture other illegal immigrants and are shown the dead body of Arul, asking if they know him. Aji and Laden are captured by the police after trying to cross the border to the US. As they are transported, the police vehicle gets into an accident, and both of them manage to escape. Pallavi then leaves Aji to proceed ahead.

Aji finds his cousin Cyril, who tells him that he met with Sarah, who told him that she has already rejected Aji, and has agreed to marry the other man. He says she might have called Aji initially to self-validate her position with him before marrying another person. Aji, along with Cyril, goes to meet Sarah on her wedding day as his father had insisted, and Aji conveys to her that it was good that they separated, and the experience that his journey gave him was one of the most memorable in his life.

Later, when Aji is about to leave, Cyril says "Our first love should never ever become successful!. If it does, then our life will end there" and asks Aji to stay back, as his he might be permanently banned from re-entering the US, and also says that if Aji wants to stay, he can make arrangements. Aji denies his offer and jokes to him that he has now found an alternative for a side dish for consuming alcoholic beverages and says that his homeland calls him.

On the plane, he meets Pallavi. She explains that she got arrested along with Akai, and both of them are getting deported back to India and China respectively. Pallavi and Aji then embark on their journey together back to India.

In a post-credits scene, it explains that Aji's political opinions were not a success either since Kora Sir, the local Kerala Congress leader, won the election and so did Donald Trump in the US.

Cast 

 Dulquer Salmaan as Aji “Ajjippaan” Mathew 
 Karthika Muralidharan as Sarah Mary Kurien
 Chandini Sreedharan as Pallavi
 Siddique as Mathews
 Parvathi T as Lissy
 Soubin Shahir as Joemon
 Dileesh Pothan as Hari
 Emmanuel Mani as Protestor
 Jinu Joseph as Cyril
 John Vijay as Arul Jebaraj Peter
 Sumit Naval as Che Guevara (Voice dubbed by Fahadh Faasil)
 Sal Yusuf as Karl Marx
 Maniyanpilla Raju as Babychan
 Sujith Shankar as Manoj
 Sandeep Narayanan as police officer
 Rosshan Chandra as Bus Driver
 Alencier Ley Lopez as Politician
 V. K. Sreeraman (Guest Appearance)
 Surabhi Lakshmi as Deepa
 Harilal as Priest Palai
 C. R. Omanakuttan as Kora Sir
 Paul Nguyen Cuong as Akai
 Amala Shaji as Choir girl in Church (Palai)

Soundtrack

All the songs are composed by Gopi Sundar and are released online through the composer's own YouTube channel titled Gopi Sundar Music Company.

Reception

Critical response 
Comrade in America received mixed to positive reviews from critics. Writing for Times of India, Sanjith Sidhardhan said that "The film is an entertaining affair, which has humour, drama, great visuals, a good soundtrack and most of all, a splendid performance by Dulquer." Anu James of International Business Times gave 3.5 stars out of five and wrote that "Comrade in America is an entertaining flick with Dulquer's impressive performance, few one-liners, beautiful picturisation, catchy music and after all with Amal Neerad touch. It is not just a movie to hail communism, and degrade others; communism just exists in the background that becomes the life for Aji, unlike what we have seen in Oru Mexican Aparatha or Sakhavu."  Prem Udayabhanu of Malayala Manorama writes "Dulquer Salmaan is ushered in with the aura of a mass appearance and that sets the tempo of narrative, which also hinges on a beautiful father-son portrayal, though they are opposite poles in the political spectrum."

Elizabeth Thomas, in her review for Deccan Chronicle, gave 3.5 stars out of five and wrote that "CIA is, in many ways, a fresh attempt by Amal Neerad. It is different from his usual making style. The script by Shibin Francis takes a fresh plot, which makes the story interesting. Aji’s journey is told in a different tone and set in a new landscape, which is unfamiliar to the Malayali audience. Aji’s mass entry and his power-packed and quick-witted dialogues lift the mood of the movie."

References

External links
 

2017 films
2010s Malayalam-language films
Indian action adventure films
Indian romantic action films
Films set in Mexico
Films shot in Mexico
Films directed by Amal Neerad
Films about Indian Americans